Dorka Drahota-Szabó (born 31 January 2002) is a Hungarian tennis player.

Drahota-Szabó has career-high WTA rankings of 656 in singles, achieved on 21 June 2021, and 547 in doubles, set on 25 October 2021.

She made her WTA Tour main-draw debut at the 2021 Budapest Grand Prix, where she received a wildcard into the doubles tournament.

ITF Circuit finals

Singles: 1 (runner–up)

Doubles: 6 (4 titles, 2 runner–ups)

ITF Junior Circuit finals

Singles: 2 (0–2)

Doubles: 1 (1–0)

References

External links
 
 

2002 births
Living people
Hungarian female tennis players
21st-century Hungarian women